Georgenia ruanii is a bacterium. It is Gram-positive, motile and short-rod-shaped.

References

Further reading
Whitman, William B., et al., eds. Bergey's manual® of systematic bacteriology. Vol. 5. Springer, 2012.

External links

Type strain of Georgenia ruanii at BacDive -  the Bacterial Diversity Metadatabase

Micrococcales
Bacteria described in 2007